The swamping problem is a problem that appears in the context of epistemology that shows that the idea that knowledge has no additional value over true belief. The problem assumes that knowledge is a true justified belief—the canonical definition—and proceeds to show that knowledge has no more value over true belief by showing that the justification requirement does not add value to the definition. The first known historical mentioning of the problem is in Plato's Meno, when Meno and Socrates have a discussion on how they should choose their guide to Larissa. Meno suggests that they need someone who knows the route, but Socrates suggests that someone with true opinion will do as well.

External links
The value of knowledge-SEP
What is the swamping problem
The swamping problem
Coherentist theories of epistemic justification-SEP

Epistemology